Bherumal Meharchand Advani  (1875/76 – 7 July 1950) was an Indian poet and prose writer who wrote in Sindhi. He was also a scholar, educationist, novelist, linguist and historian who authored more than 40 books.

Biography 
He was born in Hyderabad, Sindh (now in Pakistan). The exact date of his birth and even year of birth is not known. It is either 1875 or 1876. His father's name was Meharchand Advani. He studied at Mission School and Union Academy Hyderabad. The Union Academy was founded by Sadhu Navalrai and Heeranand Shaukiram on 28 October 1888. The aim of this school was to impart religious instruction, to spread the knowledge of Sanskrit,  and to built up of a sound footing the character of the young generation. At Union Academy he learnt poetry of Shah Abdul Latif Bhitai from the renowned scholars Heeranand and Tarachand Shaukiram. He married three times. From first wife, he did not have any child. From his second marriage, he had one son and one daughter. From his third marriage, he had two daughters.

He started his career as a Distillery Inspector in the Salt Department at Kotri, Sindh. He served in this Department for 28 years. In 1925 he was appointed as a lecturer of Sindhi in D.J. Sindh College, Karachi. Later on, he served as Chairman of Sindhi Department in the same college. He moved to India in 1949 and lived in Pune where he died on 7 July 1950.

Renowned Indian writer Hiro Thakur has written a book on his biography and contributions.

Contributions 
He has authored more than 40 books. Some of his most popular books are listed below. A complete list can be found elsewhere.

Dramas/stories 
Some of his drama and stories include:
  (Ali Baba and Forty Thieves), drama, 1903
 , novel, 1910
 , translated novel
  (Drama of cloth venders), drama, 1921
  (Sick Nightingale), drama, 1902
 , translated novel, 1926
 , novel 
  (Greedy), translation of Shakespeare's King John, 1916 
 , novel
 , drama, 1925
 , translated novel, 1927
  (Varial and Naimat), novel, 1910
  (Great Social Trial), drama 1925

History 
His most popular books on history include:
 Amilan jo Ahwal (A History of the Amils)
 Hindustan Ji Tareekh (A History of India), 1909
 Qadeem Sindh (Ancient Sindh), 1944
 Sindh jay Hinduan ji Tareekh (History of Sindhi Hindus), Part I & II 1946 & 1947
 Sodhan ji Sahibi or Ranan Jo Raj (Rule of Sodhas and Reign of Ranas), 1924

Linguistic 
He was a lover of Sindhi language, grammar and social sciences. He was also well versed in Sanskrit, Arabic and Persian. As a language expert and grammarian, he authored many books including the following:
 Alif Bay Keenan Thahi (How did alphabet come into being), 1925
 Ghareeb-ul-Lughat (Dictionary of Sindhi), 1907
 Gulqand - Part I & II 1940 & 1945
 Pahakan Ji Peerih
 Rītun ain Rasman jo buniyādu (Origin of Rituals and Customs)
 Sindhi Boli (Sindhi Language), 1925
 Sindhi Bolia Ji Tareekh (History of Sindhi Language)
 Wado Sindhi Waya Karan (Advanced Sindhi Grammar), 1925

Poetry 
He named himself as "Gharib" (Humble) in his poetry. His poetry may be divided into two parts: for children and for adults. One of his poetry collection  for children  Gulzar-e-Nazem (Garden of Poetry) was published in 1926.

Latifiyat 
He was master of the poetry of Shah Abdul Latif Bhitai, the greatest Sufi poet of Sindh. His book Latifi Sair (Latif's Travel, 1929) is a masterpiece in which  he had depicted in detail Shah Latif's travel to Hinglaj and back to Girnar and Thar. His other books on the poetry of Shah Abdul Latif Bhitai include:

Bhitai Ghot
Gurbukshania varo Shah jo Risalo

Sur Sorath

Other books  
Advani authored and compiled a number of other books which include the following:

 Bahar-e-Naser
Chund Kalam: Shah, Sami, Sachal, Dilpat, Bedil, Bekus, Ruhal ain Deewan-i Gulaman Cunda
Dey ain Wath
Gulzar-e-Naser: Selection from modern prose
 Mahan-jo-Daro, one of the most ancient sites of the East which has aroused world-wide interest
Sindh ain Sindhi
Sindh Jo Sailani

References 

1870s births
1950 deaths
20th-century Indian male writers
20th-century Indian scholars
Indian male writers
Indian scholars
Sindhi people
People from Hyderabad, Sindh
Scholars from Sindh
Sindhi-language writers
Writers from Pune
Writers from Sindh